Max Ammermann (born 5 November 1878 in Hamburg, date of death unknown) was a German rower who competed in the 1900 Summer Olympics. He was the coxswain the German boat Favorite Hammonia, which won the bronze medal in the coxed fours final A. However the IOC medal database credits the bronze medal only to Gustav Moths, who participated only in the semi-final.

References

External links
 
 

1878 births
Year of death missing
Coxswains (rowing)
Olympic rowers of Germany
Rowers at the 1900 Summer Olympics
German male rowers
Place of death missing